The 1987 ECAC Hockey Men's Ice Hockey Tournament was the 26th tournament in league history. It was played between March 6 and March 14, 1987. Quarterfinal games were played at home team campus sites, while the 'final four' games were played at the Boston Garden in Boston, Massachusetts. By winning the tournament, Harvard received the ECAC's automatic bid to the 1987 NCAA Division I Men's Ice Hockey Tournament.

Format
The tournament featured three rounds of play. The four teams that finish below eighth place in the standings are not eligible for tournament play. In the quarterfinals the first seed and eighth seed, the second seed and seventh seed, the third seed and sixth seed and the fourth seed and fifth seed played a two-game series to determine the winner. In the two games no overtime was permitted and if the two teams remained tied after the two games then a 10-minute mini-game would be played where a sudden-death overtime was allowed if the scheduled time did not produce a victor. After the opening round every series becomes a single-elimination game. In the semifinals, the highest seed plays the lowest remaining seed while the two remaining teams play with the winners advancing to the championship game and the losers advancing to the third place game. The tournament champion receives an automatic bid to the 1987 NCAA Division I Men's Ice Hockey Tournament.

Conference standings
Note: GP = Games played; W = Wins; L = Losses; T = Ties; PTS = Points; GF = Goals For; GA = Goals Against

Bracket
Teams are reseeded after the first round

Note: * denotes overtime period(s)

Quarterfinals

(1) Harvard vs. (8) Brown

(2) Colgate vs. (7) Rensselaer

(3) St. Lawrence vs. (6) Vermont

(4) Yale vs. (5) Clarkson

Semifinals

(1) Harvard vs. (7) Rensselaer

(3) St. Lawrence vs. (4) Yale

Third Place

(4) Yale vs. (7) Rensselaer

Championship

(1) Harvard vs. (3) St. Lawrence

Tournament awards

All-Tournament Team
None

MOP
Lane MacDonald (Harvard)

References

External links
ECAC Hockey
1986–87 ECAC Hockey Standings
1986–87 NCAA Standings

ECAC Hockey Men's Ice Hockey Tournament
ECAC tournament